Yury Sumtsov (born 4 September 1944) is a Russian former swimmer. He competed in two events at the 1964 Summer Olympics for the Soviet Union.

References

1944 births
Living people
Russian male swimmers
Olympic swimmers of the Soviet Union
Swimmers at the 1964 Summer Olympics
Place of birth missing (living people)
Soviet male swimmers